Simon de Phares was a French astrologer and natural philosopher who is known from his works and the manuscripts that he collected. He served in the court of Mathieu de Nanterre, Duke John II of Bourbon. He is known only by his manuscript Recueil des plus célèbres astrologues et quelques hommes doctes written to appeal against allegations of sorcery made against him.

Simon was born possibly in Meung-sur-Loire and little is known about his early life. He studied law in Orleans and studied at Paris before working under Mathieu de Nanterre and afterwards under John II of Bourbon. He trained under Conrad Heingarter, travelled to England, Scotland and Ireland before returning to France. He also travelled to Italy, Egypt and Switzerland. After 1488 he settled in Lyons where he raised a family and established a large library and continued to provide astrological services. King Charles VIII sought him in 1490 but shortly after, he was accused of sorcery and his library was confiscated. He then moved to Paris and wrote a manuscript justifying astrology and to appeal against the actions made against him. This manuscript contains an early history of the understanding of astronomy from the period and claims on the art of divination. These include notes on a comet of 1402 that he called Verru, the teaching of medicine and astrology in France and numerous other aspects of the period. The work was examined in detail by Ernest Wickersheimer in 1929 and again by Jean-Patrice Boudet in 1994.

References 

French astrologers